White Plains were a British pop music group that existed from 1969 to 1976. They had an ever-changing line-up of musicians and five UK hit singles, all on the Deram Records label, in the early 1970s.

Career
White Plains evolved from the late 1960s pop/psychedelic band the Flower Pot Men, composed of Tony Burrows, Pete Nelson, and Robin Shaw together with Neil Landon (who went to Fat Mattress). The band was primarily a studio project led by John Carter. The last single of the Flower Pot Men for Deram Records was composed by Roger Greenaway and was an attempt at a hit single in the style of the then popular Love Affair called "In a Moment of Madness".  The single did not chart and for the next single the band's name was changed to White Plains.  The band's songs were mainly produced and written by Greenaway and Roger Cook.

White Plains released several hit songs, including 1970's "My Baby Loves Lovin'" (number 13 on the US charts and number 4 in Canada), and 1971's "When You Are a King" (number 13 on the UK Singles Chart) that was translated to Hebrew and covered by the Israeli singer, Shlomo Artzi.  "Lovin' You Baby" reached number 35 in Canada. White Plains kept changing their line-up during a relatively short existence.  Burrows was the band's original lead singer. At the same time Burrows did studio work, singing on hits by Brotherhood of Man, the Pipkins (again with Roger Greenaway), and Edison Lighthouse. Dave Kerr-Clemenson also left Edison Lighthouse in 1973 to join White Plains.

The group's top-selling song "My Baby Loves Lovin'", was recorded on 26 October 1969, and was released on 9 January 1970 on the Decca Records imprint, Deram Records. The song has been featured on many CDs, including a White Plains compilation and The Voice of Tony Burrows, a compilation of hits sung by Burrows under the various group names. The full-length album version of "My Baby Loves Lovin'" has never been featured on any CD.

"I've Got You on My Mind" was a UK hit, reaching number 17. The 1973 hit "Step into a Dream" was used in the British television commercials for Butlins' holiday camps.  Burrows, Nelson, and Shaw met again in 1974 in First Class, another John Carter project that scored worldwide with their single, "Beach Baby".

Personnel

 Tony Burrows, vocals (left after the 1969 recordings)
 Pete Nelson, vocals, piano (1969 onwards) (born Peter William Lipscomb, 10 March 1943, Uxbridge, London)
 Robin Shaw, bass (1969-1973) (born Robin George Scrimshaw, 6 October 1943, Hayes, Middlesex)
 Neil Landon, guitars
 Ricky Wolff, vocals, guitars, keyboards, flute, saxophone (1969-1971) (born 8 July 1945, Pretoria, South Africa)
 Ron Reynolds, organ (mid-1972 onwards)
 Robin Box, lead guitar (1969 onwards) (born 19 June 1944)
 Eamonn Carr, Vocals, lead guitar, keyboards. (1973 )
 Roger Hills, drums (1969, mid-1970 onwards)
 David Kerr-Clemenson (bass guitar/vocals) (1973 onwards)
 Roger (Tex) Marsh (percussion) (1973 onwards)
 Tony Hall, tenor sax (1971-1972)
 Brent Scott Carter, tenor sax (1971-1972)
 Julian Bailey, drums (early-mid 1970)
 Brian Johnston, keyboards (1970)
 Dave Fulford, lead guitar (1974-1976)
 Tony Sullivan, bass guitar/vocals (1974-1976)

Discography

Albums

Studio albums

Compilation albums

Singles

See also
List of 1970s one-hit wonders in the United States
List of performers on Top of the Pops

References

External links
45cat discography

White Plains website

Deram Records artists
English pop music groups
Musical groups established in 1969